Raoul is a census-designated place (CDP) in Habersham County, Georgia, United States. As of the 2010 census, the CDP had a population of 2,558, up from 1,816 at the 2000 census.

Geography

Raoul is located in the southwest corner of Habersham County at  (34.449668, -83.603337). It is bordered to the northeast by the town of Alto and to the southeast by Banks County. Georgia State Route 13 (Gainesville Highway) forms the Banks County line at Raoul, and four-lane U.S. Route 23 (Tommy Irwin Parkway) forms the northwest edge of the community.

Demographics

As of the census of 2010, there were 2,558 people, 348 households, and 262 families residing in the CDP. The racial makeup of the CDP was 66.8% White, 24.6% African American, 0.4% Native American, 0.7% Asian, 6.0% from other races, and 1.4% from two or more races. Hispanic or Latino of any race were 10.2% of the population.

There were 405 households, out of which 35.6% had children under the age of 18 living with them, 54.3% were married couples living together, 14.4% had a female householder with no husband present, and 24.7% were non-families. 20.1% of all households were made up of individuals, and 6.3% had someone living alone who was 65 years of age or older.  The average household size was 2.91 and the average family size was 3.36.

In the CDP, the population was spread out, with 13.1% under the age of 20, 8.83% from 20 to 24, 49.2% from 25 to 44, 24.5% from 45 to 64, and 4.3% who were 65 years of age or older. The median age was 36.1 years. Raoul has the highest percentage of females found in any U.S. city. Females made up 80.6% of the population, and 86.9% of the population from ages 20 to 64 were female.  This imbalance is caused by there being over a thousand women at Lee Arrendale State Prison, an all women's prison (since 2005) whose address although listed as Alto, GA actually is within the limits of Raoul.

As of the 2000 census,  $35,192, and the median income for a family was $36,538. Males had a median income of $25,313 versus $18,750 for females. The per capita income for the CDP was $6,871.  About 14.4% of families and 18.7% of the population were below the poverty line, including 25.3% of those under age 18 and 15.8% of those age 65 or over.

Government and infrastructure
Georgia Department of Corrections Lee Arrendale State Prison is in Raoul.

Education
All of Habersham County is served by the Habersham County School District.

References

Census-designated places in Habersham County, Georgia
Census-designated places in Georgia (U.S. state)
Unincorporated communities in Habersham County, Georgia
Unincorporated communities in Georgia (U.S. state)